"Passion" is a song by Rod Stewart that first appeared in 1980 on his album Foolish Behaviour. It was the lead single and biggest hit from the album.  The song was also released as a 12-inch promotional single with an extended running time of 7:30.

Background
"Passion" describes the ubiquity of the phenomenon, delineating its universality by listing many of the people, places, and situations in which it is found. Passion is described as a powerful but dangerous essential motivator, being so compelling that it is prone to sometimes break outside the boundaries of loving relationships. 'Hear it on the radio' and 'read it in the papers' speaks of the potentially disruptive power of unleashed desire.

Reception
Billboard said that ". This up-tempo number has strong pop orchestration effectively pitted against Stewart's throaty vocals" and that the song has a "catchy" hook.  Record World said that the song has "menacing guitar runs,  percussion fever & [Stewart's] vocal parchment."

Personnel
Rod Stewart – lead and backing vocals
Jim Cregan – guitar
Gary Grainger – guitar
Phil Chen – bass
Kevin Savigar – keyboards, synthesizers
Carmine Appice – drums, Roland CR-78 programming
Paulinho da Costa - percussion

Chart performance
The song reached number five on the US Billboard Hot 100 and number two in Canada. It was also a sizeable hit across Europe.

Weekly charts

Year-end charts

Popular culture
"Passion" was prominently featured in the 1984 drama film New York Nights (later known as Shackin' Up).

References

1980 singles
1980 songs
Rod Stewart songs
Songs written by Rod Stewart
Warner Records singles
Songs written by Kevin Savigar
Number-one singles in South Africa